The 2010 European Cup Winter Throwing was held on 20 and 21 March 2010 at the Stade Fernand Fournier in Arles, France. It was the tenth edition of the athletics competition for throwing events and it was organised by the European Athletics Association and the Fédération française d'athlétisme (French athletics federation).

The competition featured men's and women's contests in shot put, discus throw, javelin throw and hammer throw. In addition to the senior competitions, there were also under-23 events for younger athletes.

Andrei Mikhnevich of Belarus was the original winner of the shot put (and a frequent world medallist during the period). In 2013 all his results from August 2005 onwards were annulled after a retest of his doping sample from the 2005 World Championships in Athletics proved to be positive, resulting in a lifetime ban for the athlete.

On the first day of competition, Andrei Mikhnevich easily won the men's shot put competition, even though his winning mark of 21.04 metres was somewhat short of his earlier form in the season. Nadine Müller had the women's discus gold all wrapped up and used her last throw to attain a new personal best of 64.30 m in the event. The women's hammer competition was a modest affair in terms of distance but Betty Heidler still won the gold by some metres. Russian javelin thrower Ilya Korotkov led the men's contest throughout and asserted his strength with a last round throw of 83.28 m.

The final day of the meeting was highlighted by Martina Ratej's first round Slovenian record throw to win the women's javelin contest, upsetting the defending champion and favourite Mariya Abakumova. Markus Münch provided his second personal best in as many years at the Winter Throwing event, but on this occasion his best was enough to take the gold in the men's discus. Following gold at the 2010 World Indoors, Nadzeya Astapchuk dominated the women's shot put: six of her throws that day were enough to win, although an injury hampered her performance and she was far from her best form. The men's hammer was a close contest with the experienced Nicola Vizzoni just keeping the young Belarusian Yury Shayunou at bay. Sandra Perković was one of the stand-out performers in the under-23s competition: having set a Croatian national record in the discus in the weeks prior to the competition, she won the women's gold with a throw of 61.93 m – which would have been enough for a silver medal in the senior ranks.

Medal summary

Senior

Under-23

References

Results
Arles  FRA  20 - 21 March  Throws. Tilastopaja. Retrieved on 2010-03-23.

External links
Official competition website
Official European Athletics website

European Throwing Cup
European Cup Winter Throwing
International athletics competitions hosted by France
2010 in European sport
History of Arles